is a single by Japanese boy band Kanjani Eight. It was released on December 4, 2013. It debuted in number one on the weekly Oricon Singles Chart and reached number one on the Billboard Japan Hot 100. It was the 33rd best-selling single in Japan in 2013, with 192,573 copies.

References 

2013 singles
2013 songs
Japanese-language songs
Kanjani Eight songs
Oricon Weekly number-one singles
Billboard Japan Hot 100 number-one singles